Neaspilota signifera is a species of tephritid or fruit flies in the genus Neaspilota of the family Tephritidae.

Distribution
United States, Mexico.

References

Tephritinae
Insects described in 1894
Diptera of North America